Eoghan Mahony is an American television writer and producer known for his work on Rome, Drive and Star Wars: The Clone Wars. He served as a staff writer and co-executive producer on the CBS crime drama The Mentalist.

Television work

Early career 
Mahony began his career working as a story editor on the second season of the HBO period drama Rome and wrote a second season episode. After which he worked as a co-producer on the short-lived Drive and was then recruited to write on the first season of The Mentalist. He has also written a number of episodes of the animated series Star Wars: The Clone Wars.

Episodes by Mahony

Rome 
"Philippi" (2.06)

Star Wars: The Clone Wars 
"Hostage Crisis" (1.22)
"Legacy of Terror" (2.07)
"R2 Come Home" (2.21)
"Supply Lines" (3.03) (with Steven Melching)

The Mentalist 
"Red Brick and Ivy" (1.10)
"Paint it Red" (1.13)
"Red Sauce" (1.20)
"A Price Above Rubies" (2.09)
"Red Letter" (2.22)
"The Red Ponies" (3.05)
"Bloodsport" (3.11)
"Redacted" (3.20)
"Blood and Sand" (4.05)
"Red is the New Black" (4.13)
"Pink Champagne on Ice" (4.19)
"If It Bleeds, It Leads" (5.07)
"Red Lacquer Nail Polish" (5.15)
"Behind the Red Curtain" (5.18) (with Erika Green Swafford)
"The Red Tattoo" (6.05) 
"White as the Driven Snow" (6.15)
"Brown Eyed Girls" (6.19) (with Michael Weiss)

References

External links 

American television writers
American male television writers
American television producers
Living people
Place of birth missing (living people)
Year of birth missing (living people)